For instant messaging, a presence information watcher is an entity that requests presence information about a presentity from a presence service. Usually in order to get presence information a watcher have to subscribe for it to a presence server. When subscribed, the watcher receives event notifications as presence information changes. Alternatively watcher may fetch presence information without subscribing to it.

References
Day, M., J. Rosenberg, and H. Sugano. "A Model for Presence and Instant Messaging." RFC 2778. February 2000.

Instant messaging